Lepidoderma is a genus of slime molds in the family Didymiaceae.

Selected species

References

Amoebozoa genera
Myxogastria